YMCA Hayo-Went-Ha Camps is an arm of the State YMCA of Michigan which administers a pair of camps in northwestern Michigan.  Started in 1904 with the founding of YMCA Camp Hayo-Went-Ha for Boys, the organization provides year round outdoor activities.  The primary focus of both camps is the summer program, which offers two to four-week, single gender camp experiences for children in 3rd through 11th grades.  Other functions include outdoor education and challenge course retreats for local schools and cross-country skiing.

YMCA Camp Hayo-Went-Ha for Boys

Camp Hayo-Went-Ha for Boys lies in Central Lake Township in Antrim County, Michigan along the northeastern shore of Torch Lake (Antrim County, Michigan), occupying  on a cape called Hayo-Went-Ha point.  Founded in 1904 by the State YMCA of Michigan, the camp has operated continuously as a summer camp for boys between 4th and 11th grades.  Buildings on the boys camp have been named for generous donors and past campers including Bonbright Lodge given my a Flint Industrialist, the Dow Building and the Stanley S. Kresge Lodge.

YMCA Camp Arbutus/Hayo-Went-Ha for Girls

During the 1980s, attempts were made by the state YMCA to include girls in camping activities. In the early 1990s, a girls' camp was formed at nearby Bows Lake. This facility, however, proved to be insufficient for long term use. The state YMCA then acquired Camp Arbutus, a camp south of Traverse City, Michigan on Arbutus Lake, which became the new site of YMCA Camp Arbutus Hayo-Went-Ha for Girls.

External links
Official Hayo-Went-Ha Camps Website

Buildings and structures in Antrim County, Michigan
Buildings and structures in Grand Traverse County, Michigan
1904 establishments in Michigan
Hayo-Went-Ha
Hayo-Went-Ha